Ubisoft Entertainment SA (formerly Ubi Soft Entertainment SA) is a French video game publisher headquartered in Saint-Mandé with development studios across the world. Its video game franchises include Assassin's Creed, Far Cry, For Honor, Just Dance, Prince of Persia, Rabbids, Rayman, Tom Clancy's, and Watch Dogs.

History

Origins and first decade (1986–1996) 
By the 1980s, the Guillemot family had established themselves as a support business for farmers in the Brittany province of France and other regions, including into the United Kingdom. The five sons of the family – Christian, Claude, Gérard, Michel, and Yves – helped with the company's sales, distribution, accounting, and management with their parents before university. All 5 gained business experience while at university, which they brought back to the family business after graduating. The brothers came up with the idea of diversification to sell other products of use to farmers; Claude began with selling CD audio media. Later, the brothers expanded to computers and additional software that included video games. In the 1980s, they saw that the costs of buying computers and software from a French supplier was more expensive than buying the same materials in the United Kingdom and shipping to France, and came upon the idea of a mail-order business around computers and software. Their mother said they could start their own business this way as long as they managed it themselves and equally split its shares among the 5 of them. Their first business was Guillemot Informatique, founded in 1984. They originally only sold through mail order, and then were getting orders from French retailers, since they were able to undercut other suppliers by up to 50% of the cost of some titles. In 1985, the brothers established Guillemot Corporation for similar distribution of computer hardware. As demand continued, the brothers recognised that video game software was becoming a lucrative property and decided that they needed to get into the industry's development side, already having insight on the publication and distribution side. Ubi Soft (formally named Ubi Soft Entertainment S.A.) was founded by the brothers on 28 March 1986. The name "Ubi Soft" was selected to represent "ubiquitous" software.

Ubi Soft initially operated out of offices in Paris, moving to Créteil by June 1986. The brothers used the chateau in Brittany as the primary space for development, hoping the setting would lure developers, as well as to have a better way to manage expectations of their developers. The company hired Nathalie Saloud as manager, Sylvie Hugonnier as director of marketing and public relations, and programmers, though Hugonnier had left the company by May 1986 to join Elite Software. Games published by Ubi Soft in 1986 include Zombi, Ciné Clap, Fer et Flamme, Masque, and Graphic City, a sprite editing programme. As their first game, Zombi had sold 5,000 copies by January 1987. Ubi Soft also entered into distribution partnerships for the game to be released in Spain and West Germany. Ubi Soft started importing products from abroad for distribution in France, with 1987 releases including Elite Software's Commando and Ikari Warriors, the former of which sold 15,000 copies by January 1987. In 1988, Yves Guillemot was appointed as Ubi Soft's chief executive officer.

By 1988, the company had about 6 developers working from the chateau. These included Michel Ancel, a teenager at the time noted for his animation skills, and Serge Hascoët, who applied to be a video game tester for the company. The costs of maintaining the chateau became more expensive, and the developers were given the option to relocate to Paris. Ancel's family which had moved to Brittany for his job could not afford the cost of living in Paris and returned to Montpellier in southern France. The Guillemot brothers told Ancel to keep them abreast of anything he might come up with there. Ancel returned with Frédéric Houde with a prototype of a game with animated features that caught the brothers' interest. Michel Guillemot decided to make the project a key one for the company, establishing a studio in Montreuil to house over 100 developers in 1994, and targeting a line of 5th generation consoles such as the Atari Jaguar and PlayStation. Their game, Rayman, was released in 1995. Yves managed Guillemot Informatique, making deals with Electronic Arts, Sierra On-Line and MicroProse to distribute their games in France. Guillemot Informatique began expanding to other markets, including the United States, the United Kingdom, and Germany. They entered the video game distribution and wholesale markets and by 1993 had become the "largest" distributor of video games in France.

Worldwide growth (1996–2003) 
Within 2 years, the company established worldwide studios in Annecy (1996), Shanghai (1996), Montreal (1997), and Milan (1998).

A difficulty that the brothers found was the lack of an intellectual property that would have a foothold in the United States market. When "widespread growth" of the Internet arrived around 1999, the brothers decided to take advantage of this by founding game studios aimed at online free-to-play titles, including GameLoft; this allowed them to license the rights to Ubi Soft properties to these companies, increasing the share value of Ubi Soft five-fold. Ubi Soft helped with Red Storm to continue to expand the series, bringing titles like Tom Clancy's Ghost Recon and Tom Clancy's Rainbow Six series. The company got a foothold in the United States when it worked with Microsoft to develop Tom Clancy's Splinter Cell, an Xbox-exclusive title released in 2002 to challenge the PlayStation-exclusive Metal Gear Solid series, by combining elements of Tom Clancy's series with elements of an in-house developed game called The Drift.

In March 2001, Gores Technology Group sold The Learning Company's entertainment division (which included games originally published by Brøderbund, Mattel Interactive, Mindscape and Strategic Simulations) to them. The sale included the rights to intellectual properties such as the Myst and Prince of Persia series. Ubisoft Montreal developed the Prince of Persia title into Prince of Persia: The Sands of Time released in 2003. At the same time, Ubi Soft released Beyond Good & Evil, Ancel's project after Rayman; it was one of Ubi Soft's first commercial "flops" on its release but which since has gained a cult following.

Around 2001, Ubi Soft established its editorial department headed by Hascoët, initially named as editor in chief and later known as the company's Chief Content Officer. Hascoët had worked alongside Ancel on Rayman in 1995 to help refine the game, and saw the opportunity to apply that across all of Ubi Soft's games. Until 2019, most games published by Ubisoft were reviewed through the editorial department overseen by Hascoët.

Continued expansion (2003–2015) 

On 9 September 2003, Ubi Soft announced that it would change its name to Ubisoft, and introduced a new logo known as "the swirl". In December 2004, gaming corporation Electronic Arts purchased a 19.9% stake in the firm. Ubisoft referred to the purchase as "hostile" on EA's part. Ubisoft's brothers recognised they had not considered themselves within a competitive market, and employees had feared that an EA takeover would drastically alter the environment within Ubisoft. EA's CEO at the time, John Riccitiello, assured Ubisoft the purchase was not meant as a hostile manoeuvre, and EA ended up selling the shares in 2010.

In February 2005, Ubisoft acquired the NHL Rivals, NFL Fever, NBA Inside Drive and MLB Inside Pitch franchises from Microsoft Game Studios.

Ubisoft established another IP, Assassin's Creed, first launched in 2007; Assassin's Creed was originally developed by Ubisoft Montreal as a sequel to Prince of Persia: The Sands of Time and instead transitioned to a story about Assassins and the Templar Knights. In July 2006, Ubisoft bought the Driver franchise from Atari for a sum of €19 million in cash for the franchise, technology rights, and most assets. Within 2008, Ubisoft made a deal with Tom Clancy for perpetual use of his name and intellectual property for video games and other auxiliary media. In July 2008, Ubisoft made the acquisition of Hybride Technologies, a Piedmont-based studio. In November 2008, Ubisoft acquired Massive Entertainment from Activision. In January 2013, Ubisoft acquired South Park: The Stick of Truth from THQ for $3.265 million.

Ubisoft announced plans in 2013 to invest $373 million into its Quebec operations over 7 years. The publisher is investing in the expansion of its motion capture technologies and consolidating its online games operations and infrastructure in Montreal. By 2020, the company would employ more than 3,500 staff at its studios in Montreal and Quebec City.

In July 2013, Ubisoft announced a breach in its network resulting in the potential exposure of up to 58 million accounts including usernames, email address, and encrypted passwords. The firm denied any credit/debit card information could have been compromised, issued directives to all registered users to change their account passwords, and recommended updating passwords on any other website or service where a same or similar password had been used. All the users who registered were emailed by the Ubisoft company about the breach and a password change request. Ubisoft promised to keep the information safe.

In March 2015, the company set up a Consumer Relationship Centre in Newcastle-upon-Tyne. The centre is intended to integrate consumer support teams and community managers. Consumer Support and Community Management teams at the CRC are operational 7 days a week.

Attempted takeover by Vivendi (2015–2018) 
Since around 2015, the French mass media company Vivendi has been seeking to expand its media properties through acquisitions and other business deals. In addition to advertising firm Havas, Ubisoft was one of the first target properties identified by Vivendi, which as of September 2017 has an estimated valuation of $6.4 billion. Vivendi, in two actions during October 2015, bought shares in Ubisoft stock, giving them a 10.4% stake in Ubisoft, an action that Yves Guillemot considered "unwelcome" and feared a hostile takeover. In a presentation during the Electronic Entertainment Expo 2016, Yves Guillemot stressed the importance that Ubisoft remain an independent company to maintain its creative freedom. Guillemot later described the need to fight off the takeover: "...when you're attacked with a company that has a different philosophy, you know it can affect what you've been creating from scratch. So you fight with a lot of energy to make sure it can't be destroyed." Vice-President of Live Operations, Anne Blondel-Jouin, expressed similar sentiment in an interview with PCGamesN, stating that Ubisoft's success was partly due to "...being super independent, being very autonomous."

Vivendi acquired stake in mobile game publisher Gameloft, owned by the Guillemots, and started acquiring Ubisoft shares. In the following February, Vivendi acquired €500 million worth of shares in Gameloft, gaining more than 30% of the shares and requiring the company under French law to make a public tender offer; this action enabled Vivendi to complete the takeover of Gameloft by June 2016. Following Vivendi's actions with Gameloft in February 2016, the Guillemots asked for more Canadian investors in the following February to fend off a similar Vivendi takeover; by this point, Vivendi had increased their share in Ubisoft to 15%, exceeding the estimated 9% that the Guillemots owned. By June 2016, Vivendi had increased its shares to 20.1% and denied it was in the process of a takeover.

By the time of Ubisoft's annual board meeting in September 2016, Vivendi had gained 23% of the shares, while the Guillemots were able to increase their voting share to 20%. A request was made at the board meeting to place Vivendi representatives on Ubisoft's board, given the size of their shareholdings. The Guillemots argued against this, reiterating that Vivendi should be seen as a competitor, and succeeded in swaying other voting members to deny any board seats to Vivendi.

Vivendi continued to buy shares in Ubisoft, approaching the 30% mark that could trigger a takeover; as of December 2016, Vivendi held a 25.15% stake in Ubisoft. Reuters reported in April 2017 that Vivendi's takeover of Ubisoft would likely happen that year and Bloomberg Businessweek observed that some of Vivendi's shares would reach the 2-year holding mark, which would grant them double voting power, and would likely meet or exceed the 30% threshold. The Guillemot family has since raised its stake in Ubisoft; as of June 2017, the family held 13.6% of Ubisoft's share capital, and 20.02% of the company's voting rights. In October 2017, Ubisoft announced it reached a deal with an "investment services provider" to help them purchase back 4 million shares by the end of the year, preventing others, specifically Vivendi, from buying these.

In the week before Vivendi would gain double-voting rights for previously purchased shares, the company, in quarterly results published in November 2017, announced that it had no plans to acquire Ubisoft for the next 6 months, nor would seek board positions due to the shares they held during that time, and that it "would ensure that its interest in Ubisoft would not exceed the threshold of 30% through the doubling of its voting rights." Vivendi remained committed to expanding in the video game sector, identifying that their investment in Ubisoft could represent a capital gain of over 1 billion euros.

On 20 March 2018, Ubisoft and Vivendi struck a deal ending any potential takeover, with Vivendi agreeing to sell all of its shares, over 30 million, to other parties and agreeing to not buy any Ubisoft shares for 5 years. Some of those shares were sold to Tencent, which after the transaction held about 5.6 million shares of Ubisoft (approximately 5% of all shares). The same day, Ubisoft announced a partnership with Tencent to help bring their games into the Chinese market. Vivendi completely divested its shares in Ubisoft by March 2019.

Since 2018
Since 2018, Ubisoft's studios have continued to focus on some franchises, including Assassin's Creed, Tom Clancy's, Far Cry, and Watch Dogs. As reported by Bloomberg Businessweek, while Ubisoft as a whole had nearly 16,000 developers by mid-2019, larger than some of its competitors, and producing 5 to 6 major AAA releases each year compared to the 2 or 3 from the others, the net revenue earned per employee was the lowest of the 4 due to generally lower sales of its games. Bloomberg Business attributed this partially due to spending trends by video game consumers purchasing fewer games with long playtimes, as most of Ubisoft's major releases tend to be. To counter this, Ubisoft in October 2019 postponed 3 of the 6 titles it had planned in 2019 to 2020 or later, as to help place more effort on improving the quality of the existing and released games. Due to overall weak sales in 2019, Ubisoft stated in January 2020 that it would be reorganizing its editorial board to provide a more comprehensive look at its game portfolio and devise greater variation in its games which Ubisoft's management said had fallen stagnant, too uniform and had contributed to weak sales.

Stemming from a wave of sexual misconduct accusations of the #MeToo movement in June and July 2020, Ubisoft had a number of employees accused of misconduct from both internal and external sources. Between Ubisoft's internal investigation and a study by the newspaper Libération, employees had been found to have records of sexual misconduct and troubling behaviour, going back up to 10 years, which had been dismissed by the human resources departments. As a result, some Ubisoft staff either quit or were fired, including Hascoët, Maxime Béland, the co-founder of Ubisoft Toronto, and Yannis Mallat, the managing director of Ubisoft's Canadian studios. Yves Guillemot implemented changes in the company to address these issues as it further investigated the extent of the misconduct claims.

In 2020, they announced that they would be making an open world Star Wars game. The deal marked an end to EA's exclusive rights to make Star Wars titles.

Ubisoft stated in its end of 2020 fiscal year investor call in February 2021 that the company will start to make AAA game releases less of a focus and put more focus on mobile and freemium games following fiscal year 2022. CFO Frederick Duguet stated to investors that "we see that we are progressively, continuously moving from a model that used to be only focused on AAA releases to a model where we have a combination of strong releases from AAA and strong back catalog dynamics, but also complimenting our program of new releases with free-to-play and other premium experiences." Later that year, the company announced it would start branding games developed by its 1st-party developers as "Ubisoft Originals".

In October 2021, Ubisoft participated in a round of financing in Animoca Brands.

After earlier stating their intent to explore blockchain games, Ubisoft announced its Ubisoft Quartz blockchain program in December 2021, allowing players to buy uniquely identified customization items for games and then sell and trade them based on the Tezos currency, which Ubisoft claimed was an energy efficient cryptocurrency. This marked the first "AAA" effort into blockchain games.

Tencent invested another  into Guillemot Brothers Limited, the company that holds part of the Guillemots' ownership of Ubisoft, in September 2022. This gave Tencent 49.9% ownership in this holding company and increased the Guillemots' share of voting rights within Ubisoft to about 30%. Yves Guillemot said that Tencent would be working closely with Ubisoft, helping to bring their games into China while assisting in paying off Ubisoft's debts and preventing the company from potential buyouts.

Subsidiaries

Former

Technology

Ubisoft Connect 

Ubisoft Connect, formerly Uplay, is a digital distribution, digital rights management, multiplayer and communications service for PC created by Ubisoft. First launched alongside Assassin's Creed II as a rewards program to earn points towards in-game content for completing achievements within Ubisoft, it expanded into a desktop client and storefront for Windows machine alongside other features. Ubisoft then separated the rewards program out as its Ubisoft Club program, integrated with Uplay. Ubisoft Connect was announced in October 2020 as a replacement for UPlay and its Ubisoft Club to launch on October 29, 2020 alongside Watch Dogs: Legion. Connect replaces UPlay and the Club's previous functions while adding support for cross-platform play and save progression for some games. It includes the same reward progression system that the Club offered to gain access to in-game content. Some games on the UPlay service will not be updated to support these reward features that they previously had under the Ubisoft Club; for those, Ubisoft will unlock all rewards for all players.

Uplay/Ubisoft Connect serves to manage the digital rights for Ubisoft's games on Windows computers, which has led to criticism when it was first launched, as some games required always-on digital rights management, causing loss of save game data should players lose their Internet connection. The situation was aggravated after Ubisoft's servers were struck with denial of service attacks that made the Ubisoft games unplayable due to this DRM scheme. Ubisoft eventually abandoned the always-on DRM scheme and still require all Ubisoft games to perform a start-up check through Uplay/Ubisoft Connect servers when launched.

Ubisoft Anvil 

Ubisoft Anvil, formerly named Scimitar, is a proprietary game engine developed wholly within Ubisoft Montreal in 2007 for the development of the first Assassin's Creed game and has since been expanded and used for most Assassin's Creed titles and other Ubisoft games, including Ghost Recon Wildlands, Ghost Recon Breakpoint and For Honor.

Disrupt 
The Disrupt game engine was developed by Ubisoft Montreal and is used for the Watch Dogs games. The majority of the engine was built from scratch and uses a multithreaded renderer, running on fully deferred physically based rendering pipeline with some technological twists to allow for more advanced effects. Developer Ubisoft Montreal spent four years creating the engine. Parts of the engine was originally intended for another game in the Driver franchise.

Dunia Engine 
The Dunia Engine is a software fork of the CryEngine that was originally developed by Crytek, with modifications made by Ubisoft Montreal. The CryEngine at the time could render some outdoor environmental spaces. Crytek had created a demo of its engine called X-Isle: Dinosaur Island which it had demonstrated at the Electronic Entertainment Expo 1999. Ubisoft saw the demo and had Crytek build out the demo into a full title, becoming the first Far Cry, released in 2004. That year, Electronic Arts established a deal with Crytek to build a wholly different title with an improved version of the CryEngine, leaving them unable to continue work on Far Cry. Ubisoft assigned Ubisoft Montreal to develop console versions of Far Cry, and arranging with Crytek to have all rights to the Far Cry series and a perpetual licence on the CryEngine.

In developing Far Cry 2, Ubisoft Montreal modified the CryEngine to include destructible environments and a more realistic physics engine. This modified version became the Dunia Engine which premiered with Far Cry 2 in 2008. The Dunia Engine continued to be improved, such as adding weather systems, and used as the basis of all future Far Cry games, and James Cameron's Avatar: The Game, developed by Ubisoft Montreal.

Ubisoft introduced the Dunia 2 engine first in Far Cry 3 in 2012, which was made to improve the performance of Dunia-based games on consoles and to add more complex rendering features such as global illumination. According to Remi Quenin, one of the engine's architects at Ubisoft Montreal, the state of the Dunia Engine as of 2017 includes "vegetation, fire simulation, destruction, vehicles, systemic AI, wildlife, weather, day/night cycles, [and] non linear storytelling" which are elements of the Far Cry games. For Far Cry 6, Ubisoft introduced more features to the Dunia 2 engine such as ray tracing support on the PC version and support for AMD's open source variable resolution technology, FidelityFX.

Snowdrop 

The Snowdrop game engine was co-developed by Massive Entertainment and Ubisoft for Tom Clancy's The Division. The core of the game engine is powered by a "node-based system" which simplifies the process of connecting different systems like rendering, AI, mission scripting and the user interface. The engine was used in Tom Clancy's The Division 2 and other Ubisoft games such as South Park: The Fractured but Whole, Mario + Rabbids: Kingdom Battle, and Starlink: Battle for Atlas. The engine is next-gen ready and will be used in Massive's Avatar: Frontiers of Pandora and a Star Wars open-world game.

Games 

According to Guillemot, Ubisoft recognised that connected sandbox games, with seamless switches between single and multiplayer modes provided the players with more fun, leading the company to switch from pursuing single-player only games to internet connected ones. According to Guillemot, Ubisoft internally refers to its reimagined self as 'before The Division and an 'after The Division.

In an interview with The Verge, Anne Blondel-Jouin, executive producer of The Crew turned vice-president of live operations, noted that The Crew was an early game of Ubisoft's to require a persistent internet connection in order to play. This raised concerns for gamers and internally at the company.

Film and television 
Ubisoft initiated its Ubisoft Film & Television division then named Ubisoft Motion Pictures in 2011. Initially developing media works tied to Ubisoft's games, it has since diversified to other works including about video games. Productions include the live-action film Assassin's Creed (2016) and the series Rabbids Invasion (2013), and Mythic Quest (2020–present).

Litigation

2020 sexual misconduct accusations and dismissals
From June to July 2020, a wave of sexual misconduct accusations occurred through the video game industry as part of the ongoing #MeToo Movement, including some of Ubisoft's employees. Ashraf Ismail, the creative director of Assassin's Creed: Valhalla, stepped down to deal with personal issues related to allegations made towards him; he was later terminated by Ubisoft in August 2020 after their internal investigations. Ubisoft announced two executives that were also accused of misconduct had been placed on leave, and that they were performing an internal review of other accusations and their own policies. Yves Guillemot stated on 2 July 2020 that he had appointed Lidwine Sauer as their head of workplace culture who is "empowered to examine all aspects of our company's culture and to suggest comprehensive changes that will benefit all of us", in addition to other internal and external programs to deal with ongoing issues that may have contributed to these problems. Specific accusations were made at Ubisoft Toronto where the studio co-founder Maxime Béland, also the vice president of editorial for Ubisoft as a whole, was forced to resign by Ubisoft's management due to sexual misconduct issues and led some employees working there to express strong concerns that "The way the studio—HR and management—disregards complaints just enables this behavior from men." Tommy François, the vice president of editorial and creative services, had been placed on disciplinary leave around July and by August, Ubisoft announced his departure from the company.

Spurred by these claims, the newspaper Libération had begun a deeper investigation into the workplace culture at Ubisoft. The paper ran a 2-part report printed on 1 and 10 July 2020 that claimed that Ubisoft had a toxic workplace culture. A component of that workplace was from accusations related to Hascoët. The issues identified by Libération and corroborated by employees from other studios suggested that some of these problems had extended from the human resource heads of the company ignoring complaints made against Hascoët, using sexual misconduct and harassment to intimidate those who criticized him, on the basis that the creative leads were producing valuable products for the company. On 11 July 2020, the company issued a press release, announcing departures which include the voluntary resignations of Hascoët, Yannis Mallat, the managing director of Ubisoft's Canadian studios, and Cécile Cornet, the company's global head of human resources. Yves Guillemot temporarily filled in Hascoët's former role.

A following report from Bloomberg News by Jason Schreier corroborated these details, with employees of Ubisoft's main Paris headquarters comparing it to a fraternity house. Schreier had found that the issues with Hascoët had gone back years and had affected the creative development on the Assassin's Creed series and other products as to avoid the use of female protagonists. Ubisoft had already been criticized for failing to support female player models in Assassin's Creed Unity or in Far Cry 4, which the company claimed was due to difficulty in animating female characters despite having done this in earlier games. Ubisoft employees, in Schreier's report, said that in the following Assassin's Creed games which did feature female protagonists at release, including Assassin's Creed Syndicate and Assassin's Creed Origins, there were serious considerations of removing or downplaying the female leads from the editorial department. This was due to a belief that Hascoët had set in the department that female characters did not sell video games. Further, because of Hascoët's clout in the company, the developers would have to make compromises to meet Hascoët's expectations, such as the inclusion of a strong male character if they had included female leads or if they had used cutscenes, a narrative concept Hascoët reportedly did not like. Hascoët's behavior among other content decisions made by Hascoët had "appeared to affect" the quality of Ubisoft's games by 2019; both Tom Clancy's The Division 2 and Tom Clancy's Ghost Recon Breakpoint "underperformed", which gave Ubisoft justification to diminish Hascoët's oversight with the aforementioned January 2020 changes in the editorial department and gave its members more autonomy. There remained questions as to what degree CEO Yves Guillemot knew of these issues prior to their public reporting; employees reported that Hascoët has been very close with the Guillemot brothers since the founding of the editorial department around 2001 and that some of the prior complaints of sexual misconduct had been reported directly to Yves and were dismissed. Gamasutra also spoke to some former and current Ubisoft employees during this period from its worldwide studios, corroborating that these issues appears to replicate across multiple studios, stemming from Ubisoft's main management.

Ubisoft had a shareholders' meeting on 22 July 2020 addressing these more recent issues. Changes in the wake of the departures included a reorganization of both the editorial team and the human resources team. 2 positions, Head of Workplace Culture and Head of Diversity and Inclusion, would be created to oversee the safety and morale of employees going forward. To encourage this, Ubisoft said it would tie the performance bonus of team leaders to how well they "create a positive and inclusive workplace environment" so that these changes are propagated throughout the company. Ahead of a September 2020 "Ubisoft Forward" media presentation, Yves Guillemot issued a formal apology for the company on their lack of responsibility in the matters prior to these events. Guillemot said "This summer, we learned that certain Ubisoft employees did not uphold our company's values, and that our system failed to protect the victims of their behavior. I am truly sorry to everyone who was hurt. We have taken significant steps to remove or sanction those who violated our values and code of conduct, and we are working hard to improve our systems and processes. We are also focused on improving diversity and inclusivity at all levels of the company. For example, we will invest $1 million over the next five years in our graduate program. The focus will be on creating opportunities for under-represented groups, including women and people of color." Guillemot sent out a company-wide letter in October 2020 summarizing their investigation, finding that nearly 25% of the employees had experienced or witnessed misconduct in the last 2 years, and that the company was implementing a 4-point plan to correct these problems, with a focus to "guarantee a working environment where everyone feels respected and safe". The company hired Raashi Sikka, Uber's former head of diversity and inclusion in Europe and Asia, as vice president of global diversity and inclusion for Ubisoft in December 2020 to follow on to this commitment.

In September 2020 Michel Ancel left Ubisoft and the games industry to work on a wildlife preserve, stating that his project Beyond Good & Evil 2 at Ubisoft and Wild as Wild Sheep Studio was left in good hands before he left. As part of their coverage from the sexual misconduct issues, Libération found that Ancel's attention towards Beyond Good & Evil 2 to be haphazard, which had resulted in delays and restarts since the game's 1st announcement in 2010. The team considered Ancel's management style to be abusive, having dismissed some of their work and forcing them to restart on development pathways. While the team at Ubisoft Montpellier had reported on Ancel's lack of organization and leadership on the project to management as early as 2017, Libération claimed it was his close relationship with Yves Guillemot that allowed the situation to continue until 2020 when a more indepth review of all management was performed in wake of the sexual misconduct allegations. Ancel stated he was not aware of the issues from the team and asserts his departure was stress-related. In November 2020, Hugues Ricour, the managing director of Ubisoft Singapore, stepped down from that role after these internal reviews and remained with the company.

The French trade union Solidaires Informatique initiated a class action lawsuit against Ubisoft in relation to the allegations; Solidaires Informatique had previously represented workers in a case of workplace concerns at French developer Quantic Dream. At the trial in May 2021, Le Télégramme reported that very little had changed within the company, as many of the HR staff that were part of the problem remained in their positions within the company, both in its France headquarters and its Canadian divisions. Employees reported to the newspaper that nothing had changed despite the new guidelines. In response to this report, Ubisoft stated that "Over a period of several months, Ubisoft has implemented major changes across its organization, internal processes and procedures in order to guarantee a safe, inclusive and respectful working environment for all team members." and "These concrete actions demonstrate the profound changes that have taken place at every level of the company. Additional initiatives are underway and are being rolled out over the coming months."

Solidaires Informatique and two former Ubisoft employees filed a 2nd lawsuit within the French courts in July 2021. As translated by Kotaku, the complaints states that Ubisoft "as a legal entity for institutional sexual harassment for setting up, maintaining and reinforcing a system where sexual harassment is tolerated because it is more profitable for the company to keep harassers in place than to protect its employees". The complaint names some of those identified during the initial 2020 accusations, including Hascoët, François, and Cornet, as directly responsible for maintaining conditions that promoted the harassment.

In July 2021, Activision Blizzard was sued by the California Department of Fair Employment and Housing (DFEH) on accusations the company maintained a hostile workplace towards women and discriminated against women in hiring and promotions. Among other reactions, this led to the Activision Blizzard employees staging a walkout on July 28, 2021 to protest the management's dismissive response to the lawsuit. About 500 employees across Ubisoft signed a letter in solidarity with the Activision Blizzard employees, stating that "It should no longer be a surprise to anyone: employees, executives, journalists, or fans that these heinous acts are going on. It is time to stop being shocked. We must demand real steps be taken to prevent them. Those responsible must be held accountable for their actions." Ubisoft CEO Yves Guillemot sent a letter to all Ubisoft employees in response to this open letter, stating "We have heard clearly from this letter that not everyone is confident in the processes that have been put in place to manage misconduct reports" and that "We have made important progress over the past year". This reply prompted another open letter from Ubisoft employees that derided Guillemot's response in that "Ubisoft continues to protect and promote known offenders and their allies. We see management continuing to avoid this issue", and that the company had generally ignored issues that employees have brought up. The employees' response included 3 demands of Ubisoft management, ending the cycle of simply rotating the troublesome executives and managers between studios to avoid issues, for the employees to have a collective seat in ongoing discussions to improve the workplace situation, and establishing cross-industry collaboration for how to handle future offenses that includes non-management employees as well as union representatives.

In August 2021, a group of Ubisoft employees formed a workers' rights group, A Better Ubisoft, to seek more commitment and action from the company in response to the allegation from the past year. The group asked for having a seat at the table to discuss how the company was handling changes and improvements to avoid having these problems come up in the future. Axios reported in December 2021 that there was an "exodus" of Ubisoft employees leaving the company due to a combination to lower pay and the impact of the workplace misconduct allegation.

Ubisoft Singapore began to be investigated by Singapore's Tripartite Alliance for Fair and Progressive Employment Practices in August 2021 based on reports of sexual harassment and workplace discrimination within that studio, following a July 2021 report published by Kotaku.

Other lawsuits 
 In 2008, Ubisoft sued Optical Experts Manufacturing (OEM), a DVD duplication company for $25 million plus damages for the leak and distribution of the PC version of Assassin's Creed. The lawsuit claims that OEM did not take proper measures to protect its product as stated in its contract with Ubisoft. The complaint alleges that OEM admitted to all the problems in the complaint.
 In April 2012, Ubisoft was sued by John L. Beiswenger, the author of the book Link who alleged copyright infringement for using his ideas in the Assassin's Creed franchise. He demanded $5.25 million in damages and a halt to the release of Assassin's Creed III which was set to be released in October 2012, along with any future games that allegedly contain his ideas. On 30 May 2012, Beiswenger dropped the lawsuit. Beiswenger was later quoted as saying he believes "authors should vigorously defend their rights in their creative works", and suggested that Ubisoft's motion to block future lawsuits from Beiswenger hints at their guilt.
 In December 2014, Ubisoft offered a free game from their catalogue of recently released titles to compensate the season pass owners of Assassin's Creed Unity due to its buggy launch. The terms offered with the free game revoked the user's right to sue Ubisoft for the buggy launch of the game.
 In May 2020, Ubisoft sued Chinese developer Ejoy and Apple and Google over Ejoy's Area F2 game which Ubisoft contended was a carbon copy of Tom Clancy's Rainbow Six Siege. Ubisoft sought copyright action against Ejoy, and financial damages against Apple and Google for allowing Area F2 to be distributed on their mobile app stores and profiting from its microtransactions.

References

External links 

 

 
1996 initial public offerings
Companies based in Île-de-France
Companies listed on Euronext Paris
French companies established in 1986
Multinational companies headquartered in France
Seine-Saint-Denis
Video game companies established in 1986
Video game companies of France
Video game development companies
Video game publishers